Subhash Kumar Sojatia (born 30 March 1952) is an Indian politician and former Minister of Home, Health, Industry, Commerce, Medical Education and Public Relations in the Government of Madhya Pradesh. He was born on 30 March 1952 in the small town of Bhanpura, located in the Mandsaur District in the Malwa region of Madhya Pradesh. Sojatia received his education at Holkar Science College.

After completing his studies, Sojatia began his career in politics, joining the Indian National Congress party in the late 1970s. He quickly rose through the ranks of the party, becoming an influential member of the Madhya Pradesh Congress Committee. In 1980, Sojatia was elected as a member of the Madhya Pradesh Legislative Assembly, representing the Garoth-Bhanpura constituency. Since then Sojatia has been a member of the Madhya Pradesh Legislative Assembly 5 times, and has been part of the Cabinet in the Digivijay Singh Congress government for 10 years.

Over the course of his political career, Sojatia has held a number of important roles and responsibilities, including serving as the Minister of Home, Health, Industry, Commerce, Medical Education, and Public Relations in the Government of Madhya Pradesh. In these roles, he has worked to improve the lives of the people of Madhya Pradesh, focusing on issues such as healthcare, education, and economic development.

Subhash Kumar Sojatia has also been an active member of the All India Congress Committee (AICC), the highest decision-making body of the Indian National Congress party. He is serving as a delegate for the AICC, representing the Madhya Pradesh region and has been the Vice President of the Madhya Pradesh Congress Committee participating in the development of party policies and strategies.

In addition to his political career, Sojatia is also known for his contributions to literature and culture. In 2014, he published a book titled Malwa ki Sanskratik Virasat evam Paryatan, which explores the rich culture and heritage of the Malwa region in great detail. The book has been widely praised for its in-depth research and engaging writing style, and is considered an important reference for those interested in the history and cultural traditions of Madhya Pradesh.

Besides his political and literary pursuits, Subhash Kumar Sojatia is also an avid agriculturist with a particular interest in organic farming. He has a strong passion for farming and is known for his support of farmers and the agricultural industry. Sojatia often speaks out in favor of policies that promote the growth and development of the agricultural sector, with a particular emphasis on the uplfitment of farmers. He has worked to implement initiatives that help farmers improve their livelihoods and increase their yields while minimizing the use of synthetic chemicals and pesticides.

In his free time, Sojatia enjoys spending time on his own farm, where he grows a variety of crops using organic farming methods. He is deeply committed to preserving the traditions and practices of farming, and is always seeking out new ways to improve the efficiency and productivity of his farm while minimizing its impact on the environment.

Sojatia is highly respected for his dedication to public service and his contributions to the cultural life of Madhya Pradesh. He continues to be an influential figure in the state's political landscape, and is known for his strong commitment to improving the lives of the people he represents. In recognition of his many achievements, Sojatia has received numerous awards and honors.

Personal life 
Sojatia was born in Bhanpura in Mandsaur District in Madhya Pradesh, India, on 30 March 1952. His father, Dr. Shri Rawatmal Sojatia, was a renowned Doctor, Philanthropist and a Public Figure. His mother is Shrimati Dhairya Prabha Devi Sojatia. He completed his schooling in Bhanpura and received his Bachelor of Science from the Holkar Science College Indore. Sojatia is married to Mrs. Urmila Sojatia, with whom he has 5 children.

References

External links 
 
 
 

1952 births
Living people
Indian male writers
Indian National Congress politicians from Madhya Pradesh
21st-century Indian politicians
Madhya Pradesh MLAs 2008–2013